The Chandler Highway is a short road in the inner eastern suburbs of Melbourne. It runs from Heidelberg Road in Alphington, crosses the Yarra River, then continues across the Eastern Freeway, then terminates at an intersection with Princess Street and Earl Street. Its total length is less than 2 kilometres, leading to the claim that it is "the shortest highway in the world". It was named after a prominent local businessman and politician A. E. Chandler, who was instrumental in pushing through the development of the Outer Circle railway.

History
The Fairfield Park to Riversdale section of the Outer Circle railway line opened on 24 March 1891, running from Fairfield station onwards through Riversdale to East Camberwell station, and eventually south to Oakleigh. It closed shortly after in 1893 from service cuts due to a lack of passengers, leaving behind a dis-used railway bridge crossing the Yarra River. After the rails were lifted from the bridge in 1919, the remaining single-track railway line, running from Fairfield station through the middle of the Heidelberg Road-Chandler Highway intersection, became the Australian Paper Manufacturers siding; the siding was later removed in the mid-1990s. The bridge was re-purposed as the "Chandler High-way" road crossing in 1930, crossing the river and subsuming the length of Fulham Road south of Heidelberg Road the former railway had cut through.

The passing of the Chandler Highway and Bridge Act 1954 through the Parliament of Victoria on 4 May 1954, declared the Chandler Highway over the former rail-bridge a "public highway"; shortly after, the bridge underwent major maintenance, deck renewal and strengthening old trusses, by the Country Roads Board (later VicRoads) commencing in December 1954 without undue interference with traffic; subsequent discovery of the amount of steel corrosion was much greater than expected, lengthening the completion time well into the following year. The Board later declared Chandler Highway a Main Road in the 1959/60 financial year, from Heidelberg-Eltham Road (today Heidelberg Road) in Alphington, to Princess Street in Kew.

Chandler Highway was signed as Metropolitan Route 21 in 1965. It shared a concurrency with Metropolitan Route 2, from Yarra Boulevard on the southern bank of the river, to the road's northern terminus with Heidelberg Road, also signed in 1965; this was replaced by Tourist Route 2 in 1989.

The passing of the Road Management Act 2004 granted the responsibility of overall management and development of Victoria's major arterial roads to VicRoads: in 2004, VicRoads re-declared the road as Chandler Highway (Arterial #5859).

The 1969 Melbourne Transportation Plan shows the Chandler Highway as part of the F6 Freeway corridor which would eventually link up to the Mornington Peninsula Freeway.

The Chandler Highway was originally planned to be extended east along the former Outer Circle railway line corridor to where Earl, Asquith and Valerie Streets intersect; the extension was to end at High Street in East Kew, and although the route is still listed as a 'proposed arterial' in 1980s editions of the Melway street directory, the reserve has since been landscaped. At the diamond interchange with the Eastern Freeway, there are visible pavements reserved for smooth (elevated) entry/exit ramps yet to be constructed.

Old Chandler Highway Bridge
The (Old) Chandler Highway Bridge is a four-span iron box girder and brick bridge crossing the Yarra River, connecting Alphington and Kew. Pairs of red brick piers mark the approaches, and have heavy moulded bluestone cappings. The girders are diagonally braced, with original wrought iron lattice balustrading. The bridge has a cantilevered walkway along the west side. The railway bridge over the Yarra River was started in February 1889 but not completed until November 1890; the supervising engineer was John Monash.

The bridge is one of the few 19th century bridges remaining in the metropolitan area. The bridge is a local landmark, being substantially intact and a prominent element in the area. On 30 June 2016, the bridge was added to the Victorian Heritage Register. It underwent a restoration once the new Chandler Highway bridges had been constructed in 2019, and today is a dedicated shared pedestrian and cycling path.

Congestion
Until the opening of the new bridge in March 2019, the highway was badly congested with traffic, since the four-lane highway needed to be funnelled into the two lanes of the old railway bridge to cross the Yarra. The bridge on the Chandler Highway regularly featured highly in the RACV/Leader bi-annual Redspot survey of Melbourne's worst points of traffic congestion, and in 2014 was named in the survey as the worst point of congestion in Melbourne.

New bridge proposals
The bridge sits on the boundary of the State Electoral Districts of Kew and Northcote.  The State Member for Northcote, Fiona Richardson (Labor) led a community campaign during the term of Premier John Brumby (2007–10) in advocating for the bridge to be duplicated.

In October 2010, VicRoads released four proposed options for improving the Yarra River crossing with a new bridge:
add an additional two lane bridge on either the east or west side of the existing bridge. The existing bridge would be retained as a two lane road bridge bringing the total lanes up to four.
add an additional four lane bridge on either the east or west side of the existing bridge. The existing bridge would be used as a pedestrian/cycle bridge. Local cycle groups wanted to see this bridge full integrated into the shared path network via the Yarra Trail and the Anniversary Trail with an extension of the Anniversary Trail to Fairfield railway station.

With the Northcote electorate being one of the few battleground contests between Labor and the Greens Political Parties at the 2010 State Election, the Chandler Highway Bridge became a key election issue. The Labor Party committed to duplicating the bridge, while the Greens opposed such duplication. The seat was subsequently held by Labor, but the Party lost the state election to the Liberal National Coalition government. Plans to duplicate the bridge halted.

In the intervening period the Amcor Paper Mill on the corner of Heidelberg Rd and Chandler Highway, Alphington ceased operations and vacated the site in 2012 before it was sold in mid 2013. Successive State governments gave high level approval for residential development at the site subject to detailed planning, to address the likely increased traffic congestion in an already gridlocked area.

On 15 June 2014 Labor Opposition Leader Daniel Andrews and Fiona Richardson announced that Labor would commit $110 million to fixing Chandler Highway with construction works to commence immediately, if Labor was elected to govern at the 2014 State Election to be held on 29 November.

New Chandler Highway Bridge

Upon its election in 2014, the Labor government announced that construction would proceed on a new six-lane bridge on the western side. This met with some objections by residents, concerned about the proximity of the road to their residences, but the then Roads Minister Luke Donnellan stated that this was a more environmentally sensitive option, which allowed Guide Dogs Victoria to continue operating on their present site. Construction commenced in mid-2017, all six lanes were opened to traffic in March 2019, and all work was declared complete in July 2019, with the old bridge converted for use by pedestrians and cyclists. The project also included the construction of a bicycle underpass under the Chandler Hwy for the Main Yarra Trail, eradicating the need for cyclists to ascend 79 steps to reach the Highway and regain the Trail on the other side.

Major intersections

See also

References

Highways and freeways in Melbourne
Transport in the City of Yarra
Transport in the City of Boroondara
Buildings and structures in the City of Boroondara
Bridges in Melbourne